Bland is a census-designated place (CDP) in and the county seat of Bland County, Virginia, United States. Bland was originally known as Bland Court House. The population as of the 2020 Census was 312.

Climate
The climate in this area has mild differences between highs and lows, and there is adequate rainfall year-round.  According to the Köppen Climate Classification system, Bland has a marine west coast climate, abbreviated "Cfb" on climate maps.

Notable person
Bob Williams, American football coach.

References

Census-designated places in Bland County, Virginia
County seats in Virginia
Census-designated places in Virginia